Live in Orange County is a DVD that was recorded by Social Distortion at the House of Blues in Anaheim, California in January 2003.

Track listing
 All songs by Mike Ness unless otherwise noted.

  "Making Believe" (Work)
  "1945"
  "Sick Boy"
  "Telling Them"
  "Bad Luck"
  "Footprints on My Ceiling"
  "Don't Drag Me Down"
  "I Wasn't Born To Follow"
  "Another State of Mind"
  "The Creeps" (Ness/Danell)
  "Mommy's Little Monster"
  "Mass Hysteria"
  "99 to Life"
  "Ring of Fire" (Carter/Kilgore)
  "Story of My Life"

Special features
 "Pre-Show Warm Up"
 Social D performs "The Creeps" during a pre-show rehearsal.
 "Rollin' for 4-5-6"
 Mike explains a game of dice called 4-5-6.
 "Outhouse Acoustics"
 Mike, Jonny and John perform "Bad Luck" acoustically in a bathroom.
 "Interviews and Hi-Jinx"
 Mike's youngest son steals the show while he is being interviewed.
 "The New School"
 Mike introduces his "pride and joy" (his two sons) to the audience during a performance.
 "Cruzin' The '36"
 Riding along with Mike and his chihuahua in his custom '36 Ford.
 "Photo Gallery"
 Still photographs taken during the performance.
 "Nona Split"
 The entire set shown from nine different camera angles at once (tiled on the screen).

Personnel
Social Distortion
 Mike Ness - Lead vocals, Guitar
 John Maurer - Bass guitar
 Jonny "2 Bags" Wickersham - Electric guitar
 Charlie Quintana - Drums

Additional personnel
 Danny McGough - B3 organ

Certifications

External links 
 

2004 films
Social Distortion
2000s English-language films